William Bromfield (1868–1950) was an English trade unionist and politician.

William Bromfield may also refer to:

William Bromfeild (1712–1792), English surgeon
William Arnold Bromfield (1801–1851), English botanist